Choi Chung-seok (born 3 April 1940) is a South Korean former sports shooter. He competed at the 1972 Summer Olympics and the 1976 Summer Olympics.

References

1940 births
Living people
South Korean male sport shooters
Olympic shooters of South Korea
Shooters at the 1972 Summer Olympics
Shooters at the 1974 Asian Games
Shooters at the 1976 Summer Olympics
Place of birth missing (living people)
Asian Games medalists in shooting
Asian Games silver medalists for South Korea
Medalists at the 1974 Asian Games
20th-century South Korean people
21st-century South Korean people